Harlem Plantation House is located on Louisiana Highway 39 between Davant and Phoenix, Plaquemines Parish, Louisiana, on the east bank of the Mississippi River about  upriver from Pointe à la Hache, Louisiana.  It was built around 1840 and added to the National Register of Historic Places on October 26, 1982.   It is a raised Creole-American plantation house.

It was substantially renovated around 1910.

References

External links

 Louisiana listing <--Broken link, November 2015.

Houses on the National Register of Historic Places in Louisiana
Houses completed in 1840
Houses in Plaquemines Parish, Louisiana
National Register of Historic Places in Plaquemines Parish, Louisiana